Leonas Eugenijus Petrauskas  (1919 – 18 July 1994) was a Lithuanian basketball player. He won two gold medals with the Lithuania national basketball team during EuroBasket 1937 and EuroBasket 1939.

Career
Leonas Petrauskas worked as a Doctor at the Engadine Medical Group, 1107 Old Prince's Highway (corner of Boronia Avenue), Engadine, NSW, Australia.  Engadine Medical Group also had a smaller practice at Heathcote, NSW, Australia.

References
Footnotes

Bibliography
 Vidas Mačiulis, Vytautas Gudelis. Halė, kurioje žaidė Lubinas ir Sabonis. 1939–1989 – Respublikinis sporto kombinatas, Kaunas, 1989

1919 births
1994 deaths
FIBA EuroBasket-winning players
Lithuanian men's basketball players
Lithuanian emigrants to Australia